Swami Sahajananda was an Indian politician and former Member of the Legislative Assembly of Tamil Nadu. He was elected to the Tamil Nadu legislative assembly as an Indian National Congress candidate from Chidambaram constituency in 1952, and 1957 elections. G. Vagheesam Pillai from Congress party was the second winner in both elections.

He was a member of the Tamil Nadu Legislative Council between 1926 and 1932 and again between 1936 and 1947. After Independence, he was elected to the Assembly from the Chidambaram constituency and continued as a member till his death in 1959.

References 

Indian National Congress politicians from Tamil Nadu
Living people
Year of birth missing (living people)